Sergio Espejo Yaksic (born 15 March 1967) is a Chilean politician and lawyer.

References

External Links
 Profile at BCN

1967 births
Living people
20th-century Chilean lawyers
University of Chile alumni
Harvard Kennedy School alumni
21st-century Chilean politicians
Christian Democratic Party (Chile) politicians